The FitzGerald dynasty is a noble and aristocratic dynasty of Cambro-Norman and Anglo-Norman origin. They have been peers of Ireland since at least the 13th century, and are described in the Annals of the Four Masters as having become "more Irish than the Irish themselves" or Gaels, due to assimilation with the native Gaelic aristocratic and popular culture. The dynasty has also been referred to as the Geraldines and Ireland's largest landowners. They achieved power through the conquest of large swathes of Irish territory by the sons and grandsons of Gerald de Windsor (c. 1075 – 1135). Gerald de Windsor (Gerald FitzWalter) was the first Castellan of Pembroke Castle in Wales, and became the male progenitor of the FitzMaurice and FitzGerald Dynasty ("fitz", from the Anglo-Norman fils indicating "sons of" Gerald). His father, Baron Walter FitzOther, was the first Constable and Governor of Windsor Castle for William the Conqueror, and was the Lord of 38 manors in England, making the FitzGeralds one of the "service families" on whom the King relied for his survival. 

The progenitor of the Irish FitzMaurices was a Cambro-Norman Marcher Lord named Maurice FitzGerald, Lord of Lanstephan, who was married to a daughter of the Norman magnate Arnulf de Montgomery, of the House of Montgomery. The Montgomeries, Lords of over 150 manors and 30 castles, were the most powerful magnates in both England and Normandy, and were of the same family as William the Conqueror. Maurice's parents were Gerald de Windsor and Princess Nest ferch Rhys, of the Welsh royal House of Dinefwr, and having married the granddaughter of the High King of Ireland, Muirchertach Ua Briain, he would play an important role in the 1169 Norman invasion of Ireland. The clan claim kinship with the Tudors who descended from the same Welsh royal line as Princess Nest's father, Rhys ap Tewdwr, King of Deheubarth. Consequently, the FitzMaurices and FitzGeralds are cousins to the Tudors (Tewdwrs in Welsh) through Princess Nest and her Welsh family.

The present-day seat of the Irish Parliament Dáil Éireann is housed in Leinster House, which was first built in 1745–48 by James FitzGerald, 1st Duke of Leinster as the ducal palace for the Dukes of Leinster. The Dukes were related to the Royal houses of Bourbon, Medici, and Habsburg, among others, as the first Duke married the great-granddaughter of King Charles II of the House of Stuart. Charles's mother, Queen Henrietta Maria de Bourbon, was the aunt of Louis XIV of Versailles, while his grandmother and great-grandmother were the Queens Marie de' Medici and Joanna of Habsburg.

In his poetry, Henry Howard, Earl of Surrey, a cousin of Anne Boleyn, also referred to Countess Elizabeth FitzGerald, (1527–89) as "Fair Geraldine", alluding to her family's Italian ancestry through the Gherardinis of Florence.

The main branches of the family are: 
 The FitzMaurices and FitzGeralds of Kildare (Earls of Kildare from 1316, later Marquesses of Kildare and from 1766 Dukes of Leinster and Premier Peers of Ireland). The current head is Maurice FitzGerald, 9th Duke of Leinster.
 The Fitzmaurices and FitzGeralds of Desmond (Barons Desmond, later Earls of Desmond).

The FitzGerald dynasty has played a major role in Irish history. Gearóid Mór, 8th Earl of Kildare and his son Gearóid Óg, 9th Earl of Kildare, were Lord Deputy of Ireland in the late-fifteenth and early-sixteenth centuries respectively. Both married to cousins of Henry Tudor, first Monarch of the House of Tudor. Thomas FitzGerald, 10th Earl of Kildare (died 1537), known as "Silken Thomas," led an unsuccessful insurrection in Ireland, while Lord Edward FitzGerald (1763–1798), the fifth son of the first duke of Leinster, was a leading figure in the 1798 Irish Rebellion against King George III of the House of Hanover. 

Many members of the Fitzmaurices also became notable over the centuries, such as William Petty Fitzmaurice, 1st Marquess of Lansdowne, the Prime Minister of Britain who negotiated with Benjamin Franklin and secured peace with America at the end of the American War of Independence, or Henry Petty-Fitzmaurice, 5th Marquess of Lansdowne, Viceroy of Canada and India, who became a half-nephew of Emperor Napoleon III, a step-grandson of Queen Hortense Bonaparte, and a great-grandson of Talleyrand, connecting the family with the Houses of Beauharnais, Talleyrand, and Bonaparte.

An example of the FitzGerald dynasty becoming "more Irish than the Irish themselves" is Gerald FitzGerald, 3rd Earl of Desmond (1335–1398), who was also known by the Irish Gaelic Gearóid Iarla (Earl Gerald).
Although made Lord Chief Justice of Ireland in 1367, Gerald wrote poetry in the Irish language, most famously the poem Mairg adeir olc ris na mnáibh ("Speak not ill of womenkind"). Indeed, although an accomplished poet in Norman French, Gerald was instrumental in the move by the Fitzmaurices and Fitzgeralds of Desmond toward greater use of the Irish language.

Etymology
The surname FitzGerald is a patronymic of the Norman form, fitz meaning "son". "Fitz Gerald" thus means in Old Norman and in Old French "son of Gerald". Gerald itself is a Germanic compound of ger, "spear", and waltan, "rule".  Variant spellings include Fitz-Gerald and the modern Fitzgerald. The name can also appear as two separate words Fitz Gerald.

Cambro-Norman origins

The earliest recorded use of the patronymic FitzGerald is that of Raoul fitz Gerald le Chambellan, member of the Tancarville family. Raoul was a Norman baron, Chamberlain of Normandy, educator of the young William, future Conqueror of England, and father of William de Tancarville, Earl of Tankerville and chief chamberlain of Normandy and England after the Norman conquest. The eponymous ancestor of the various FitzGerald branches, as well as of the de Barry and FitzMaurice families, was Gerald FitzWalter of Windsor. Gerald was a Norman adventurer who took part in the 1093 invasion of South Wales upon the death in battle of Rhys ap Tewdwr, last king of South Wales. Gerald was the youngest son of another Norman adventurer, Walter fitz Otho, William the Conqueror's Constable for the strategic military fortress of Windsor Castle, as well as the King's Keeper of the Forests of Berkshire. Domesday Book records Walter fitz Otho as tenant-in-chief of lands formerly held by conquered Englishmen in Berkshire, Buckinghamshire, Hampshire, and Middlesex. Walter's positions and most of his lands were inherited by Gerald's older brothers, Robert, Maurice, and William, the oldest, ancestor of the earls of Plymouth, while Gerald inherited the estate of Moulsford, now in Oxfordshire, near to Wallingford, where his father owned a fortified house adjacent to those of other powerful Norman authorities.

Nest ferch Rhys ap Tewdwr was the daughter of the last king of South Wales by his wife, Gwladys ferch Rhiwallon ap Cynfyn of Powys. Their grandchildren, Maurice FitzGerald, Lord of Lanstephan, Raymond le Gros and Philip de Barry were leaders in the Norman invasion of Ireland. Nest's son by her second marriage, Robert FitzStephen, was another participant, as was William de Hay, husband of one of Gerald's and Nest's granddaughters. Nest's grandson (through her son by Henry I of England, son of William the Conqueror), named Meiler FitzHenry, was appointed Lord Justice of Ireland for his cousin, King Henry II of England, member of the House of Plantagenet. 

The most renowned of Gerald's and Nest's grandchildren, Gerald of Wales, gave an account of the Norman invasion, as well as lively and invaluable descriptions of Ireland and Wales in the late 12th century. He became Archdeacon of Brecon, serving Archbishop Baldwin of Forde, a past tutor of Pope Eugene III's nephew, and worked with him at recruiting members for the Third Crusade of Richard the Lionheart against Saladin. On many attempts Gerald tried to become the Bishop of St. Davids but failed, despite having met in Rome Pope Innocent III, who would later experienced the Sack of Constantinople. More than twenty works has been produced by Gerald of Wales, and his statue can be seen today in City Hall, Cardiff, in Wales.

Gherardini of Ireland
The earliest record of the House of Gherardini of Ireland, represented by the FitzGeralds, can be traced back in the year 1413 to the accounts of Lord Antonio d'Ottaviano di Rossellino Gherardini. A priest named Maurice Fitzgerald was of passage in Florence at that time, with a Bishop of the Order of Saint Augustine, and has been able to enter in contact with one of his fellow kinsman, who then introduced him to other members of the Gherardinis. As being part of the Gherardini family that dwelt in the island of Ireland, further exchanges were eventually done by the family to meet again. A letter written in 1440 by the Chancellor of Florence, Leonardo Bruni, one of the associates of Cosimo de' Medici, stipulated that Giovanni Betti di Gherardini, a representative of the family, was sent to Ireland to become acquainted with his other kinsmen from the Geraldines of Ireland, the Earls of Kildare.
 
Confirmed as well in 1507 by the Viceroy of Ireland, Gerald Fitzgerald, to Giovanni Manni, a Florentine merchant in passage to Ireland. His son, the 9th Earl of Kildare, was also known as Lord Garret, which translates as Lord Gherardini in italian, and was married to Elizabeth Grey of the Royal House of Grey, a granddaughter of Queen Elizabeth Woodville. A letter written in 1566 by Girolamo Fortini, who was married to a daughter of Antonio Gherardini from Florence, to his brother in London, also stated that the Earl of Kildare was of the same family.

Cristoforo Landino, tutor of Lorenzo de' Medici, stated in his preface of the Divine Comedy (Comedia) of the famous poet Dante Alighieri, that the descendants of Tommaso, Gherardo, and Maurizio Gherardini were the ancestors of the Earls of Kildare and Earls of Desmonds, and went on to Conquer Ireland with the King of England. The Divine Comedy was first launch at the Palazzo Vecchio in Florence. The English poet Henry Howard, Earl of Surrey, user of the sonnet form that would later be used by William Shakespeare, also referred to the ancestral seat of the Geraldines in Florence in his poem Description and praise of his love.

Since the 15th century, the FitzGeralds and the Gherardinis are known to be in touch and to acknowledge their kinship. Recently, a cover story published by "Sette"; in 2014, the Italian weekly magazine of Corriere della Sera, an article was dedicated to the Gherardini family of Montagliari and their relationship with the FitzGerald Family as well as with the Kennedy family. According to the magazine, the three families have maintained relationship among them even in recent times or in the past (for example with American President John Fitzgerald Kennedy). The link with the Kennedy family came from the Earl of Desmond branch, and can be seen on the coat of arms granted to John FitzGerald Kennedy by the Chief Herald of Ireland.

Major houses

House of Kildare

Lords of Offaly
 Gerald FitzMaurice, 1st Lord of Offaly (c. 1150–1204), was granted estates in Ireland, confirmed by Prince John Plantagenet
 Maurice Fitzmaurice FitzGerald, 2nd Lord of Offaly (1194–1257), Justiciar of Ireland, accompanied King Henry of Winchester to Poitou and Gascony in France
 Maurice FitzGerald, 3rd Lord of Offaly (1238–1286), Justiciar of Ireland, chief magnate summoned by Prince Edward Longshanks about the wars in Ireland with Walter de Burgh, 1st Earl of Ulster

Earls of Kildare
John FitzGerald, 1st Earl of Kildare (1250–1316), already 4th Lord of Offaly, was rewarded for serving Edward I of England in Scotland
Thomas FitzGerald, 2nd Earl of Kildare (died 1328), younger (only surviving) son of the 1st Earl, in charge of 30,000 men against Earl Edward Bruce, brother of King Robert the Bruce
John FitzGerald (1314–1323), eldest son of the 2nd Earl, died in childhood
Richard FitzGerald, 3rd Earl of Kildare (1317–1329), second son of the 2nd Earl, died unmarried
Maurice FitzGerald, 4th Earl of Kildare (1318–1390), third and youngest son of the 2nd Earl, leader of the army, serving King Edward of Windsor at the siege of Calais
Gerald FitzGerald, 5th Earl of Kildare (died 1410), a son of the 4th Earl, leading opponent of the Lord Lieutenant of Ireland, John Talbot, 1st Earl of Shrewsbury
The 5th Earl had sons, but they presumably predeceased him
John FitzGerald, 6th Earl of Kildare (de jure; d. 1427), a younger son of the 4th Earl
Thomas FitzGerald, 7th Earl of Kildare (died 1478), son of the 6th Earl, was appointed Lord Deputy of Ireland by Richard Plantagenet, 3rd Duke of York
Gerald FitzGerald, 8th Earl of Kildare (c. 1456–1513), "The Great Earl", eldest son of the 7th earl, was "the uncrowned King of Ireland", he married a cousin of the Tudor King Henry VII 
Gerald FitzGerald, 9th Earl of Kildare (1487–1534), "Young Gerald", eldest son of the 8th earl, married the great-granddaughter of Elizabeth Woodville, Queen consort of King Edward IV

Thomas FitzGerald, 10th Earl of Kildare (died 1537), "Silken Thomas", eldest son of the 9th earl, led an insurrection in Ireland and his honours were forfeit, and he died unmarried
Gerald FitzGerald, 11th Earl of Kildare (1525–1585), the "Wizard Earl", second son of the 9th earl, was given a new creation in 1554, then restored to his brother's honours in 1569
Henry FitzGerald, 12th Earl of Kildare (1562–1597), second son of the 11th earl, died without male issue, married a daughter of Charles Howard, the Lord High Admiral who won the Spanish Armada 
William FitzGerald, 13th Earl of Kildare (died 1599), third and youngest son of the 11th earl, died unmarried
Gerald FitzGerald, 14th Earl of Kildare (died 1612), elder son of Edward, himself third and youngest son of the 9th earl, his mother was Countess Elizabeth Grey, a cousin of Henry VIII
Gerald FitzGerald, 15th Earl of Kildare (1611–1620), only son of the 14th earl, died in childhood
George FitzGerald, 16th Earl of Kildare (1612–1660), a son of Thomas, himself younger brother of the 14th earl, his grandfather Thomas Randolph negotiated the marriage of Mary, Queen of Scots
Wentworth FitzGerald, 17th Earl of Kildare (1634–1664), elder son of the 16th earl, married Elizabeth Vere, a granddaughter of Horace Vere, 1st Baron Vere of Tilbury of the House of De Vere
John FitzGerald, 18th Earl of Kildare (1661–1707), only son of the 17th earl, died without surviving issue, married a granddaughter of George Stewart, 9th Seigneur d'Aubigny of the House of Stuart
Henry FitzGerald, Lord Offaly (1683–1684), only son of the 18th earl, died in infancy
Robert FitzGerald, 19th Earl of Kildare (1675–1744), only son of Robert, himself younger son of the 16th earl, married a granddaughter of Sir Edward Villiers, member of the powerful House of Villiers
James FitzGerald, 20th Earl of Kildare (1722–1773) was created Marquess of Kildare in 1761, married to a daughter of Duke Charles Lennox, the great-grandson of Queen Henrietta Maria de Bourbon
 Lettice FitzGerald, 1st Baroness Offaly, suo jure Baroness Offaly (1580–1658), her maternal great-grandmother was Mary Boleyn, elder sister of Queen Anne Boleyn
 Lord Edward FitzGerald (1763–1798), Irish aristocrat and revolutionary, was a cousin of Charles James Fox, fought on the British side during the American War of Independence
 Lady Edward FitzGerald, known as "Pamela" (c. 1773–1831), wife of Lord Edward FitzGerald, adopted daughter of comtesse Stéphanie Félicité, family fled France during the French Revolution

Marquesses of Kildare (1761)
James FitzGerald, 1st Marquess of Kildare (1722–1773) was created Duke of Leinster in 1766

Dukes of Leinster, second Creation (1766)

Other titles: Marquesse of Kildare (1761), Earl of Kildare (1316), Earl of Offaly (1761), Viscount Leinster, of Taplow in the County of Buckingham (GB 1747) and Lord of Offaly (c. 1193–?)
James FitzGerald, 1st Duke of Leinster (1722–1773), elder son of the 19th earl, his wife, Lady Emily Lennox, was a cousin of King George III, and a granddaughter of Charles Lennox, 1st Duke of Richmond
William FitzGerald, 2nd Duke of Leinster (1749–1804), second son of the 1st duke, his grandson Philippe de Rohan-Chabot, Comte de Jarnac,  was a member of the French House of Rohan
George FitzGerald, Marquess of Kildare (1783–1784), eldest son of the 2nd duke, died in infancy
Augustus FitzGerald, 3rd Duke of Leinster (1791–1874), second son of the 2nd duke, member of the Privy Council and was Lord High Constable of Ireland for William IV and Queen Victoria
Other titles (4th Duke onwards): Baron Kildare (UK 1870)
Charles FitzGerald, 4th Duke of Leinster (1819–1887), eldest son of the 3rd duke, married a daughter of Duke George Sutherland-Leveson-Gower, her grandfather the 1st Duke was the wealthiest man in Britain   
Gerald FitzGerald, 5th Duke of Leinster (1851–1893), eldest son of the 4th duke, was a nephew of George Douglas Campbell, 8th Duke of Argyll, and Hugh Grosvenor, 1st Duke of Westminster
Maurice FitzGerald, 6th Duke of Leinster (1887–1922), eldest son of the 5th duke, died unmarried, grandson of William Duncombe, 1st Earl of Feversham
Edward FitzGerald, 7th Duke of Leinster (1892–1976), third and youngest son of the 5th duke, married actress Denise Orme, grandmother of Prince Aga Khan IV, was stepfather of Princess Taj-ud-dawlah
Gerald FitzGerald, 8th Duke of Leinster (1914–2004), only legitimate son of the 7th duke, his step-sister married Prince Aly Khan, son of Sultan Aga Khan III, President of the League of Nations
Maurice FitzGerald, 9th Duke of Leinster (born 1948), elder son of the 8th duke, landscape designer, brother of Lord John FitzGerald, horseracing administrator of the Sheikh of Dubai, Mohammed Bin Rashid
Thomas FitzGerald, Earl of Offaly (1974–1997), only son of the 9th duke, died unmarried in a road traffic collision
The heir presumptive is the 9th Duke's nephew Edward FitzGerald (born 1988), being the son of the present Duke's deceased younger brother Lord John FitzGerald (1952 - 2015)

House of Desmond

The line of the Earls of Desmond has been extinct since the 17th century. Their branch of the dynasty continues only in their distant collateral kinsmen, Ireland's hereditary knights (for whom see section below).

Barons Desmond (1259)
John FitzThomas, 1st Baron Desmond (died 1261) son of Thomas FitzMaurice, Lord OConnello, fought the King of Desmond Finghin Mac Cárthaigh and the O'Sullivans
Thomas FitzMaurice FitzGerald, 2nd Baron Desmond (died 1298) (grandson of preceding), was deputy justiciar and acted as Lord Chief Justice of Ireland 
Thomas FitzThomas FitzGerald, 3rd Baron Desmond (1290–1307) (son of preceding), died young with great wealth and large estates
Maurice FitzThomas FitzGerald, 4th Baron Desmond (died 1356) (brother of preceding; created earl of Desmond in 1329), married a daughter of the Prince of Thomond

Earls of Desmond, First creation (1329)

Maurice FitzGerald, 1st Earl of Desmond (died 1356) (new creation), assisted in the war against King Philip VI of France of the House of Valois
Maurice FitzGerald, 2nd Earl of Desmond (1336–1358) (son of preceding), married the daughter of Ralph Stafford, 1st Earl of Stafford, 
Gerald FitzGerald, 3rd Earl of Desmond (died 1398) (half-brother of preceding), in-law of Henry of Grosmont, Duke of Lancaster, of the House of Plantagenet
John FitzGerald, 4th Earl of Desmond (died 1399) (son of preceding), grandson of James Butler, 2nd Earl of Ormond, and descendant of Edward Longshanks
Thomas FitzGerald, 5th Earl of Desmond (c. 1386–1420) (son of preceding), withdrew to France and died at Rouen, buried in Paris with two Kings in attendance
James FitzGerald, 6th Earl of Desmond (died 1463) (the "Usurper," paternal uncle of preceding), godfather to George Plantagenet, 1st Duke of Clarence
Thomas FitzGerald, 7th Earl of Desmond (died 1468) (son of preceding), Lord Deputy of Ireland under the Duke of Clarence, brother of King Edward IV of the House of York
James FitzGerald, 8th Earl of Desmond (1459–1487) (son of preceding), married to a daughter of Thady O'Brien, Prince of Thomond, received gifts from King Richard III
Maurice FitzGerald, 9th Earl of Desmond (died 1520) (brother of preceding), supported Perkin Warbeck, pretender to the English throne, in the Siege of Waterford
James FitzGerald, 10th Earl of Desmond (died 1529) (son of preceding), fought in the War of the League of Cognac for Charles V, Holy Roman Emperor of the House of Habsburg
Thomas FitzGerald, 11th Earl of Desmond (1454–1534) (paternal uncle of preceding), signed the Treaty of Dingle with Don Gonzalez Fernandez, Ambassador of Emperor Charles V
John FitzGerald, de facto 12th Earl of Desmond (died 1536) (brother of preceding, paternal granduncle of James FitzGerald, de jure 12th Earl of Desmond)
James FitzGerald, de jure 12th Earl of Desmond (died 1540) (grandson of Thomas FitzGerald, 11th Earl of Desmond, grandnephew of John FitzGerald, de facto 12th Earl of Desmond)
James FitzGerald, 13th Earl of Desmond (died 1558) (son of John FitzGerald, de facto 12th Earl of Desmond), appointed Lord Treasurer of Ireland by King Edward Tudor
Gerald FitzGerald, 14th Earl of Desmond (c. 1533–1583) (son of preceding; forfeit 1582), fought in the Battle of Affane and led the Second Desmond Rebellion

16th Earl of Desmond, appointed by Hugh O'Neill (1598–1601)
 James FitzThomas FitzGerald the Sugán Earl, died in Tower of London c.1607, was chased by George Carew, 1st Earl of Totnes

Earls of Desmond, Second creation (1600)
James FitzGerald, 1st Earl of Desmond (1571–1601) (known as the "Tower Earl of Desmond"), son of Eleanor Butler, Countess of Desmond

Lords of Decies
 Gerald Fitzgerald, 3rd Lord Decies, married to a daughter of Piers Butler, 8th Earl of Ormond, member of the House of Butler

House of Corsygedol

The House of Corsygedol is a branch of the Lords of Desmond, now Earls of Desmond, and was founded by Osborn Fitzgerald, descendant of Gerald de Windsor. He came into Wales from Ireland with Prince Llywelyn the Great and was granted estates and arms. One of its cadet branches is the House of Yale of Plas-yn-Yale, represented by the Yale family. Their coat of arms are those of Osborn Fitzgerald ; viz. erm. on saltire gu. a crescent or. Crest is a wild boar in a toil.

FitzMaurice of Kerry

The closely related FitzMaurice Barons and later Earls of Kerry continue in the male line with the current Petty-FitzMaurice Marquesses of Lansdowne, but they descend from John FitzGerald, 1st Baron Desmond's nephew, Thomas FitzMaurice, 1st Baron of Kerry, son of his brother Maurice FitzThomas. Thus in fact they represent a "sister" branch to the FitzGeralds of Desmond. However this technically makes them slightly closer to the FitzGeralds of Desmond than either are to the Offaly-Kildare-Leinster Geraldines, represented by the modern Dukes of Leinster, who descend from Gerald FitzMaurice, 1st Lord of Offaly, uncle of the 1st Baron Desmond.

Hereditary knights
These three hereditary knighthoods were created for their kinsmen by the Earls of Desmond, acting as Earls Palatine.
 Knight of Kerry (Green Knight) – the holder is Sir Adrian FitzGerald, 6th Baronet of Valencia, 24th Knight of Kerry. He is also a Knight of Malta, and President of the Irish Association of the Sovereign Military Order of Malta.
 Knight of Glin (Black Knight) – dormant (from 2011), after the death of Desmond FitzGerald, 29th Knight of Glin, the ancestral seat for over 700 years is Glin Castle.
 White Knight (Fitzgibbon family) – dormant (from 1611), after the death of Maurice Oge Fitzgibbon, 12th White Knight.

Legacy

According to the 1890 Matheson report, Fitzgerald/FitzGerald was the 36th most common surname in Ireland.

Fitzgerald/FitzGerald is the 692nd most frequent surname in the United Kingdom. The surname occurs most frequently in the following ten counties, in descending order, with the number of occurrences in parentheses: "1. Greater London, (500), Greater Manchester (191), West Midlands (176), Lancashire (130), Kent (118), Essex (117), West Yorkshire (113), Merseyside (108), Hampshire (84), and Surrey (76)."

"Fitzgerald" (including "FitzGerald," as the survey was not case-sensitive), was the 390th most common surname in the 2000 United States Census. 73,522 Fitzgeralds were counted, with 27.25 Fitzgeralds per 100,000 members of the population. Respondents surnamed Fitzgerald had self-reported ethnicities of 88.03% non-Hispanic white only, 8.44% non-Hispanic black only, 0.32% non-Hispanic Asian or Pacific Islander only, 1.28% non-Hispanic Asian only, 1.43% of two or more non-Hispanic races, and 1.43% Hispanic.

The FitzGerald dynasty was the subject of a poem called "The Geraldines" by Thomas Osborne Davis, the chief organizer and poet of the nationalist Young Ireland movement. The ill-fated romance of Thomas FitzGerald, 5th Earl of Desmond with Catherine MacCormac was the subject of the air "Desmond's Song" by the Irish poet Thomas Moore.

Saint Patrick's Saltire, sometimes used to represent Ireland in modern flags, may have derived from the arms of the Geraldines.

The   in the United States Navy is named for Lieutenant William Charles Fitzgerald, USN. The Fitzgerald family coat of arms (a white shield with a red saltire) provides the foundation for the coat of arms for USS Fitzgerald.

A variety of people, places, and businesses bear the name FitzGerald or Fitzgerald, including the FitzGerald crater on the far side of the Moon, named for physicist George FitzGerald.

See also

 Irish nobility
 Hiberno-Norman
 FitzGerald baronets
 Butler–FitzGerald dispute

References

External links 

 
Áine
Clíodhna
Irish royal families